There are several systems for romanization of the Telugu script.

Systems

Vowels

Consonants

Irregular Consonants

Other diacritics

 Virama (్) mutes the vowel of a consonant, so that only the consonant is pronounced. Example:  క + ్ → క్  or  +  → .
 Anusvara (ం) nasalize the vowels or syllables to which they are attached. Example:  క + ం → కం or  +  → 
 Candrabindu (ఁ) also nasalize the vowels or syllables to which they are attached. Example:  క + ఁ → కఁ or  +  → .
 Visarga (ః) adds a voiceless breath after the vowel or syllable it is attached to. Example: క + ః → కః or  +  →

UN romanization for geographical names
The United Nations romanization systems for geographical names (approved 1972, I1/11; amended in 1977 IH/12) was based on a report prepared by D. N. Sharma.

The UN romanization uses macrons for long vowels ā ī ū, a dot under ṛ for vocalic r, and caron on ĕ and ŏ. 
ka kā ki kī ku kū kṛ kĕ ke kai kŏ ko kau

ISO
There are differences between the UN system and the ISO transliteration standard ISO 15919: 2001

ITRANS
ITRANS also has transliteration for Telugu.

RTS
Used in Vemuri Rao's English-Telugu Dictionary (2002) Rice University's Reverse Transliteration System (RTS) (created by Ramarao Kanneganti and Ananda Kishore) can be used for the transliteration of Telugu into Roman script as an alternative to phonetic alphabet. The RTS is defined below. (1) Represent short vowels by the lower case ..."
RTS represents short vowels by the lower case English character and long vowels by the corresponding upper case character: అ = a, ఆ = A; etc.
Unaspirated consonant-vowel pairs are represented by a lower case letter followed by a suitable vowel.
The result is a phonetic representation mostly suitable for dictionaries and computer input methods. Examples: 
 vaiDUryaM 
 gOmEdhikaM

References

External links
 Library of Congress Telugu romanization table

Telugu language
Romanization